Pandinotoxins are toxins from the venom of the emperor scorpion Pandinus imperator. They are selective blockers of voltage-gated potassium channels

Sources

The source for the pandinotoxins is the venom of the scorpion Pandinus imperator.

Chemistry

Family
The toxins of the family are designated pandinotoxin (PiTX)-Kα, PiTX-Kβ, and PiTX-Kγ   They are members of the α-KTx family of scorpion toxins.

Structure and homology

Pandinotoxin Kα and -β
The amino acid sequences of PiTX-K α and PiTX-K β are identical, except for the seventh amino acid: a proline in PiTX-Kα and a glutamic acid in PiTX-Kβ (see Fig.1).

PiTX-Kα and PiTX-Kβ are 35-residue peptides, which are found to have an α-helix from residues 10 to 21 and two β-sheets (β 1 is from residues 26-28, β 2 is from residues 33-35). One face of the α-helix is anchored to the β-sheet by three disulfide bonds which are conserved in all members of the charybdotoxin family (R-K toxins).
PiTX-K α and PiTX-K β have only two β-sheets whereas other members of the family have three additional amino acid residues at the N-terminal portion, which forms a third β-sheet.

Pandinotoxin Kγ
Pandinotoxin Kγ has not yet been investigated.

Target
Pandinotoxins are the most potent inhibitors of the rapidly inactivating A-type voltage-gated potassium channels. They also block the delayed rectifier, slowly inactivating channels of the subfamily A member 2 (Kv1.2/KCNA2) [1] and they can reversibly block the shaker B potassium-channels (Kv1.1 sub-family).

Mode of action
The residue K27, a lysine at place 27 of the protein sequence, interacts with the voltage sensitivity blocking activity of CTX channels. It is conserved among PiTX-K α and PiTX-K β. This amino acid is located nearby the selectivity filter of the pore  and it is responsible for the interaction with A-type channels by being inserted in the pore of the ion channels.
The structural differences in the backbone and side chain between PiTX-Kα and CTX result in a higher affinity for A-type channels for PiTX-Kα.
The affinity for the Shaker B K+ channel is significantly smaller for PiTX-Kβ in comparison with PiTX-Kα owing to the changes in the seventh residue.

Therapeutic use
Intraplantarly injection of PiTX-Kα before or after the administration of diclofenac produces a significant reduction in spontaneous flinching, mechanical allodynia and thermal hyperalgesia in a rat model for bone cancer. Downregulation of PiTX-Kα almost completely eliminates diclofenac-induced anti-nociception.

References

Neurotoxins
Ion channel toxins
Scorpion toxins